Mirka Vasiljević (born 27 September 1990) is a Serbian actress and occasional model and television presenter. She rose to domestic fame with the 2005 film We Are Not Angels 2, the sequel to the 1992 cult film We Are Not Angels. Vasiljević has since established a career as one of the most eminent young actors in Serbia. In 2005, she earned a Rose d'Or Award for Best Television Actress nomination for her work on Love, Habit, Panic.

Personal life 
Since 2009, Vasiljević has dated footballer Vujadin Savić, the son of legendary Serbian footballer Dušan Savić. In 2011, it was revealed the couple was expecting a baby, later confirmed to be a boy. After that they got one more son and daughter. They are not still married, but recently Vujadin announced they would get married, probably in 2018.

Vasiljević took intensive ballet lessons to prepare herself for the role in television series TNW: Totally New Wave.

Filmography

Awards and nominations

References

External links 
 

Living people
1990 births
Actresses from Belgrade
Association footballers' wives and girlfriends
Serbian female models
Serbian film actresses
Serbian stage actresses
Serbian television actresses
Serbian television personalities
21st-century Serbian actresses